Cornips agelasta is a species of moth of the family Tortricidae. It is found in the Ruwenzori Mountains in the border region of the Democratic Republic of Congo and Uganda.

References

Moths described in 1965
Archipini